Godfrey Walter Phillimore, 2nd Baron Phillimore  (of Shiplake in the County of Oxford) (b Henley-on-Thames 29 December 1879; d Cape Town 28 November 1947) was an English peer, soldier and author.

He was the eldest surviving son of Walter Phillimore, 1st Baron Phillimore and his wife Agnes, daughter of Charles Manners Lushington, M.P. He was educated at Christ Church, Oxford and was admitted to the Middle Temple on 1 November 1900. He withdrew without being Called to the Bar on 13 January 1928. During World War I he served with the Highland Light Infantry. He wrote a book about his time in captivity entitled "Recollections of a prisoner of war". He married twice, but his eldest son, Anthony Francis, predeceased him, having been killed near Arras, France, 23 May 1940, in World War II.

Notes

1879 births
1947 deaths
Alumni of Christ Church, Oxford
Barons in the Peerage of the United Kingdom
Deputy Lieutenants of Oxfordshire
Recipients of the Military Cross
Highland Light Infantry officers
English male writers